Alexander Vasilyevich Belyakov (– 28 November 1982) was a Soviet flight navigator who, together with command pilot Valery Chkalov and co-pilot Georgy Baydukov, set a record for the longest uninterrupted flight in 1936 and made , flying from Moscow to Vancouver, Washington.

He was elected to the Supreme Soviet of the Soviet Union and served as a lieutenant general of the Soviet Air Forces.

Biography

Early life and training
Alexander Belyakov was born in 1897 in the village of Bezzubovo, Moscow Governorate (now Orekhovo-Zuyevsky District, Moscow Oblast) and grew up in Ryazan. He studied forestry in 1915-1916 after finishing his gymnasium studies and began serving in the infantry of the Imperial Russian Army in 1916.

He fought in the Soviet Russian Red Army's 25th Rifle Division during the Russian Civil War. He graduated from the Moscow Aerophotogrammetry School of the Red Air Fleet in 1921 and subsequently taught there and at the A.E.Zhukovsky Air Force Academy until 1935.

He graduated from the Kachinskoye Military Aviation School for Pilots and joined the Communist Party in 1936.

1930s records

Flight to Udd Island
Belyakov joined commanding pilot Valery Chkalov and co-pilot Georgy Baydukov to navigate a Tupolev ANT-25 plane on a non-stop flight from Moscow to Udd Island (now Chkalov Island) off the coast of Kamchatka in a 56-hour flight on 20–22 July 1936. Their flight, covering more than 9,374 kilometers across nearly the entire width of the Union of Soviet Socialist Republics, set a record for the longest non-stop flight, preparing the way for a flight across the North Pole.

The three aviation heroes were awarded the title Hero of the Soviet Union and decorated with the Order of Lenin for the record-breaking flight.

Across the North Pole to America
Flying the same ANT-25 plane, Chkalov, Baydukov, and Belyakov completed an 8,504-kilometer flight from Moscow to the United States, crossing the North Pole and landing in Vancouver, Washington. The fliers set another record by performing the first non-stop polar flight and establishing a new route from the Soviet Union to the United States.

Later career

The domestic and international press coverage of the Trans-Polar flight immediately catapulted to worldwide fame and ultimate acclaim for the three aviators, who had already been regarded as Soviet heroes after their successful flight to Udd Island in 1936. The aviators' portraits were featured on a postage stamp issued to commemorate the flight. The three were elected to the Supreme Soviet of the Soviet Union in 1937.

Alexander Belyakov was appointed head of the Ryazan Supreme School of Navigators of the Soviet Air Force in the 1940s and took part in the fighting against Nazi Germany as the 16th Air Army's chief navigator during the Battle of Berlin. Promoted to lieutenant-general during the war, he continued to serve in the Air Force and became a professor at the Moscow Institute of Physics and Technology upon his retirement from the service in 1960.

He joined Georgy Baydukov to attend the unveiling of a Vancouver monument commemorating their transpolar flight in 1975.

Belyakov died in Moscow on 28 November 1982 and was interred at Moscow's Novodevichy Cemetery.

Honors and legacy
Aside from the Order of Lenin awarded together with the title Hero of the Soviet Union on 24 July 1936 (subsequently Gold Star No. 9 was also added), Belyakov was awarded another Lenin Order and was a recipient of three Orders of the Red Banner, an Order of the Patriotic War 1st class, Order of the Red Banner of Labour twice, three Orders of the Red Star, and additional medals.

He received the degree of Doctor of Geography in 1938.

An island off Kamchatka in the Sea of Okhotsk was given the name Belyakov Island (Ostrov Belyakova) in honor of Alexander Belyakov.

References

External links
 The Chkalov Transpolar Flight Marker at Pearson Field in Vancouver, Washington (The Historical Marker Database).

1897 births
1982 deaths
20th-century Russian male writers
20th-century Russian non-fiction writers
People from Orekhovo-Zuyevsky District
People from Bogorodsky Uyezd
Communist Party of the Soviet Union members
First convocation members of the Soviet of the Union
Academic staff of the Moscow Institute of Physics and Technology
Heroes of the Soviet Union
Recipients of the Order of Lenin
Recipients of the Order of the Red Banner
Recipients of the Order of the Red Banner of Labour
Recipients of the Order of the Red Star
Flight navigators
Russian aviation record holders
Russian male writers
Russian military personnel of World War I
Russian navigators
Russian non-fiction writers
Soviet Air Force generals
Soviet aviation record holders
Soviet aviators
Soviet lieutenant generals
Soviet male writers
Soviet military personnel of the Russian Civil War
Soviet military personnel of the Winter War
Soviet military personnel of World War II
Soviet non-fiction writers
Burials at Novodevichy Cemetery